Manjiro "Matty" Matsuda (1887-1929)  was a Judo practitioner who later became a professional wrestler.  Matsuda was born in Japan but emigrated to the United States, and wrestled in many different areas. He was promoted by William Muldoon who also managed boxing heavyweight champion John Sullivan.  Matsuda wrestled many different opponents throughout his career. He eventually became a champion by defeating Tiger Daly.  Matsuda later died as a result of injuries sustained in the ring against Basanta Sinzh

References

Japanese male judoka
Japanese catch wrestlers
Japanese male mixed martial artists
Mixed martial artists utilizing judo
Mixed martial artists utilizing jujutsu
Mixed martial artists utilizing catch wrestling
20th-century deaths
Japanese jujutsuka
20th-century professional wrestlers
American male professional wrestlers
Japanese male professional wrestlers